Angelaki: Journal of the Theoretical Humanities is a bimonthly peer-reviewed academic journal that was established in 1993. It covers "work in the disciplinary fields of literary criticism and theory, philosophy, and cultural studies." Since 1998, it has been published by Routledge. The editor-in-chief is Pelagia Goulimari (University of Oxford), who was also the founding executive editor. In 1996, the journal was named "Best New Journal" in the annual awards of the Council of Editors of Learned Journals.

From 1993 until 2010 the journal published three issues a year. This was increased to four issues a year in 2011. In 2018, the frequency was further increased to six issues per volume, a volume normally comprising four special issues and two general issues.

Associated book series
In 1996, editors of the journal established an associated book series, Angelaki Humanities, with Manchester University Press. In July 2021, the series Angelaki: New Work in the Theoretical Humanities was established by Routledge for these books.

Abstracting and indexing
The journal is abstracted and indexed in:

References

External links

Angelaki: New Work in the Theoretical Humanities - book series, published by Routledge
Angelaki Humanities - book series, published by Manchester University Press
In Theory 1993–2003 - a 2003 document celebrating the journal's tenth anniversary and listing a large selection of writers/essay titles published 1993–2003
List of special issues
Multidisciplinary humanities journals
Publications established in 1993
Social philosophy journals
Cultural journals
Bimonthly journals
Hybrid open access journals
English-language journals
Routledge academic journals
Routledge books